A regional election was held in Madeira on 17 October 2004, to determine the composition of the Legislative Assembly of the Autonomous Region of Madeira.
All 68 members of the regional parliament were up for an election, an increase of 6 compared with 2000.

The winner of the election in Madeira was, once more, the Social Democratic Party, and Alberto João Jardim was elected president of the Regional Government with an absolute majority for an 8th consecutive time. The percentage gathered by the Social Democrats decreased by 2%, however, due to the increase of the overall number of MPs, the party gained 3 seats and achieved 44 seats. The People's Party decreased its voting share and its number of MPs, gathering just 2 seats, one of their worst performances.

On the left, the Socialist Party achieved one of their best result until this date, only surpassed by the results in the 2019 elections, by winning more than 27% of the votes and election 19 members to the regional parliament. The Unitary Democratic Coalition, led by the Portuguese Communist Party, was able to hold on to their 2000 voting share and the 2 MPs of the previous election. The Left Bloc elected one MPs in their first run for the Madeira regional parliament and gathered 3.7% of the votes.

Voter turnout was lower, compared with 2000, with 60.5% of the electorate casting their ballot on election day.

Electoral system
In this election, the members of the regional parliament were elected in 11 constituencies, representing the 11 municipalities of Madeira, that were awarded a determined number of member to elect according with the number of registered voters in those constituencies. The method use to elect the members was the D'Hondt method. In this election the number of MPs to be elected rose from 61 in 2000 to 68.

Political parties
A total of 5 political parties presented lists of candidates for the regional elections in Madeira, where 277,774 electors could elect 68 deputies to the Legislative Assembly. The list of parties running was the following:

 Left Bloc (BE), leader Paulo Martinho Martins
 Democratic Unity Coalition (CDU), leader Edgar Silva
 People's Party (CDS-PP), leader José Manuel Rodrigues
 Socialist Party (PS), leader  Jacinto Serrão de Freitas
 Social Democratic Party (PSD), leader Alberto João Jardim

Results

Summary of votes and seats

|-
! rowspan="2" colspan=2 style="background-color:#E9E9E9" align=left|Parties
! rowspan="2" style="background-color:#E9E9E9" align=right|Votes
! rowspan="2" style="background-color:#E9E9E9" align=right|%
! rowspan="2" style="background-color:#E9E9E9" align=right|±pp swing
! colspan="5" style="background-color:#E9E9E9" align="center"|MPs
! rowspan="2" style="background-color:#E9E9E9;text-align:right;" |MPs %/votes %
|- style="background-color:#E9E9E9"
! style="background-color:#E9E9E9;text-align=center|2000
! style="background-color:#E9E9E9;text-align=center|2004
! style="background-color:#E9E9E9" align=right|±
! style="background-color:#E9E9E9" align=right|%
! style="background-color:#E9E9E9" align=right|±
|-
| 
|73,973||53.71||2.2||41||44||3||64.71||2.5||1.20
|-
| 
|37,751||27.41||6.4||13||19||6||27.94||6.6||1.02
|-
| 
|9,691||7.04||2.7||3||2||1||2.94||2.0||0.42
|-
| 
|7,590||5.51||0.9||2||2||0||2.94||0.4||0.53
|-
|style="width: 10px" bgcolor=#8B0000  align="center" | 
|align=left|Left Bloc
|5,035||3.66||||||1||||1.47||||0.40
|-
|colspan=2 align=left style="background-color:#E9E9E9"|Total valid
|width="50" align="right" style="background-color:#E9E9E9"|134,040
|width="40" align="right" style="background-color:#E9E9E9"|97.31
|width="40" align="right" style="background-color:#E9E9E9"|0.6
|width="40" align="right" style="background-color:#E9E9E9"|61
|width="40" align="right" style="background-color:#E9E9E9"|68
|width="40" align="right" style="background-color:#E9E9E9"|7
|width="40" align="right" style="background-color:#E9E9E9"|100.00
|width="40" align="right" style="background-color:#E9E9E9"|0.0
|width="40" align="right" style="background-color:#E9E9E9"|—
|-
|colspan=2|Blank ballots
|1,425||1.03||0.1||colspan=6 rowspan=4|
|-
|colspan=2|Invalid ballots
|2,269||1.65||0.4
|-
|colspan=2 align=left style="background-color:#E9E9E9"|Total
|width="50" align="right" style="background-color:#E9E9E9"|137,734
|width="40" align="right" style="background-color:#E9E9E9"|100.00
|width="40" align="right" style="background-color:#E9E9E9"|
|-
|colspan=2|Registered voters/turnout
||227,774||60.47||1.4
|-
| colspan=11 align=left | Source: Comissão Nacional de Eleições
|}

Distribution by constituency

|- class="unsortable"
!rowspan=2|Constituency!!%!!S!!%!!S!!%!!S!!%!!S!!%!!S
!rowspan=2|TotalS
|- class="unsortable" style="text-align:center;"
!colspan=2 | PSD
!colspan=2 | PS
!colspan=2 | CDS-PP
!colspan=2 | CDU
!colspan=2 | BE
|-
| style="text-align:left;" | Calheta
| style="background:; color:white;"|67.7
| 3
| 8.1
| -
| 19.4
| -
| 1.6
| -
| 1.0
| -
| 3
|-
| style="text-align:left;" | Câmara de Lobos
| style="background:; color:white;"|64.1
| 6
| 19.4
| 2
| 5.8
| -
| 5.2
| -
| 3.1
| -
| 8
|-
| style="text-align:left;" | Funchal
| style="background:; color:white;"|46.6
| 15
| 28.7
| 9
| 7.5
| 2
| 8.7
| 2
| 5.6
| 1
| 29
|-
| style="text-align:left;" | Machico
| style="background:; color:white;"|55.8
| 4
| 36.6
| 2
| 2.5
| -
| 1.8
| -
| 1.4
| -
| 6
|-
| style="text-align:left;" | Ponta do Sol
| style="background:; color:white;"|54.7
| 1
| 35.2
| 1
| 6.0
| -
| 1.0
| -
| 1.6
| -
| 2
|-
| style="text-align:left;" | Porto Moniz
| style="background:; color:white;"|64.3
| 2
| 30.2
| -
| 2.6
| -
| 0.7
| -
| 0.6
| -
| 2
|-
| style="text-align:left;" | Porto Santo
| style="background:; color:white;"|55.5
| 1
| 38.0
| 1
| 2.0
| -
| 1.1
| -
| 0.7
| -
| 2
|-
| style="text-align:left;" | Ribeira Brava
| style="background:; color:white;"|66.9
| 3
| 18.7
| -
| 6.4
| -
| 2.5
| -
| 2.5
| -
| 3
|-
| style="text-align:left;" | Santa Cruz
| style="background:; color:white;"|49.8
| 5
| 31.2
| 3
| 7.1
| -
| 5.5
| -
| 3.6
| -
| 8
|-
| style="text-align:left;" | Santana
| style="background:; color:white;"|66.7
| 3
| 21.6
| -
| 6.3
| -
| 1.2
| -
| 1.3
| -
| 3
|-
| style="text-align:left;" | São Vicente
| style="background:; color:white;"|52.3
| 1
| 35.8
| 1
| 6.0
| -
| 0.8
| -
| 1.5
| -
| 2
|- class="unsortable" style="background:#E9E9E9"
| style="text-align:left;" | Total
| style="background:; color:white;"|53.7
| 44
| 27.4
| 19
| 7.0
| 2
| 5.5
| 2
| 3.7
| 1
| 68
|-
| colspan=12 style="text-align:left;" | Source: Comissão Nacional de Eleições
|}

See also
Madeira

References

External links
Election results
Comissão Nacional de Eleições

2004 elections in Portugal
2004 in Portugal
2004